Photo Ninja is a raw image processing software by PictureCode, first released as a finished product in September 2012. It includes Noise Ninja noise reduction algorithms. Development of Noise Ninja as a separate product was discontinued when Photo Ninja was introduced.

References

External links
Review by Digital Camera Review
Review by MacWorld
Review by Nikonians

Raster graphics editors
2012 software
Raw image processing software